Guitarsongs Volume 1 is the debut EP by American shred guitarist Katrina Johansson, released in December 2005 by M.A.C.E. Music. The record is notable for featuring Michael Angelo Batio on bass.

Track listing
All songs were written by Katrina Johansson.

"Driven" – 3:36
"K-9 Lullaby" – 4:06
"Intuition" – 3:21
"Daredevil" – 3:29

Credits
Katrina Johansson – guitars, production
Michael Angelo Batio – bass, engineering and mixing on tracks 1, 2 and 3
Brad Rohrssen – drums on tracks 1, 2 and 3
Chris Djuricic – engineering and mixing on tracks 1, 2 and 3
Jim Harvey – mixing on "Daredevil"
Ron Reid – mixing on "Daredevil"

References

External links
Katrina Johansson official site
Katrina Johansson MySpace page
Katrina Johansson Dean Guitars profile

2005 debut EPs
Katrina Johansson albums